Rabor County is in Kerman province, Iran. The capital of the county is the city of Rabor. At the 2006 census, the region's population (as Rabor District of Baft County) was 33,718 in 7,664 households. The following census in 2011 counted 34,392 people in 9,818 households, by which time the district had been separated from the county to form Rabor County. At the 2016 census, the county's population was 35,362 in 11,513 households.

Administrative divisions

The population history and structural changes of Rabor County's administrative divisions over three consecutive censuses are shown in the following table. The latest census shows two districts, four rural districts, and two cities.

References

 

Counties of Kerman Province